Jennifer Lee Daugherty (November 8, 1979 – February 11, 2010) was an American woman who was torture-murdered in Greensburg, Pennsylvania as an act of revenge in February 2010. Daugherty, who was mentally disabled, was tortured and murdered before being wrapped in Christmas decorations, put inside a garbage can, and dumped in the parking lot of Greensburg-Salem Middle School.

Perpetrators 
Amber Meidinger met Melvin Knight at a homeless shelter in Washington in January 2010. They moved to several locations before settling in Greensburg, Pennsylvania, where they met Jennifer Daugherty. Knight met Ricky Smyrnes after meeting previously in jail.

Knight 
Melvin L. Knight (born October 27, 1989) was born to a drug-addicted father who was imprisoned during the early years of his life. He developed lifelong learning and social problems after he fell out of a moving vehicle and hit his head at age 5.

Marinucci 
Angela Lynn Marinucci (born July 14, 1992), according to testimony by her mother and half-sister, Marinucci suffered a head injury when she was hit by a truck in 2008, at the age of 15. The injury substantially altered her behavior and pushed her into a downward spiral that ended with Daugherty’s death, according to the defense. Two mental experts testified that Marinucci as a child, suffered from depression and that she may have had drug and alcohol addictions as a teenager.

Masters

Meidinger 
Meidinger told jurors, "at some point, she [Daugherty] trusted me because she knew me from the West Place (a center for people with special needs)." Meidinger testified she and her then-boyfriend and co-defendant Melvin Knight met Smyrnes on February 8, 2010, after she and Knight had been staying at a Greensburg-area hotel. Knight and Smyrnes knew each other after meeting in jail, and Meidinger was pregnant with Knight's child when all three met up. Smyrnes offered Meidinger and Knight to stay at his apartment at 428 N. Pennsylvania Avenue in Greensburg.

Miller

Smyrnes 
Ricky Ven Edward Smyrnes (born March 6, 1986) was born to a drug-addicted Philadelphia sex worker and a Pittsburgh gang member. He was moved into and out of foster homes as a child and was treated for mental health disorders as early as age 4. He suffered abuse and neglect until he was taken in by the Smyrnes family in North Huntingdon at age 10, according to testimony by forensic psychologist Alice Applegate. His lawyer, Terri Fayes, told the jury that Smyrnes suffered sexual and physical abuse from his father and his uncle. She also explained how he had tried beer, cocaine, heroin, and marijuana by age 6, had been diagnosed with PTSD at age 8, and had undergone 103 therapy sessions by age 10. She added he was diagnosed as having as many as seven different personalities, and 15 total psychiatric issues. In 1997, he burglarized his neighbor's home and stole knives, guitars, coins, bullets, and cash. That same year, he sexually assaulted a woman in her basement.

Torture 
According to a testimony by Meidinger, the group went through her purse and stole money, gift cards, and her cell phone. They poured liquids into her bag, hit her head with filled soda bottles, cut her hair, painted her face with nail polish, and dumped liquid and spices on her head. Meidinger said she and Angela Marinucci took turns violently hitting Daugherty with a metal towel rack and crutches. She also noted that Daugherty was stripped naked, gagged, and raped by Knight. They also forced her to consume feces, urine, and detergent. Meidinger also said Knight took Daugherty to the living room where Marinucci poured a bottle of water over Daugherty's head and Knight and Smyrnes dumped oatmeal and spices on her head. Daugherty said that her eyes were burning, and Smyrnes told her to take a shower because she smelled bad.

According to her relatives, Daugherty had the mental abilities of an adolescent, trusted everyone, and thought that the suspects were her "friends."

Murder 
Daugherty's last words were a note to her mother that said, “Mom, I hope you have a good day at work, and I love you very much. Love, Jennifer”.

According to his testimony, Masters helped Daugherty retrieve her clothes that Knight and Smyrnes had stripped from her and tossed out a window on the first day of the beatings. Before Daugherty could get her clothes and get out, Knight and Smyrnes returned to the apartment at 428 N. Pennsylvania Ave. As a result, the group voted to kill her. Miller decided to tie her with Christmas lights. They forced her to write a fake suicide note and then stabbed her to death. Smyrnes gave Knight a steak knife and stabbed her in the chest and throat. Her body was stuffed inside a garbage can, and dumped in the parking lot of Greensburg-Salem Middle School. Marinucci told police officials that Knight and Meidinger drugged her before stabbing her.

Possible motives 
Several witnesses claimed Marinucci planned to kill Daugherty several days before the rest began planning. They testified Marinucci overheard her boyfriend, Smyrnes, calling Daugherty and telling her that he loved her and wanted to marry her. During Smyrnes' testimony, he told jurors about the love triangle between Daugherty, Marinucci, and Smyrnes.

Trial
At the start of the trial on November 3, 2010, the prosecution was seeking the death penalty for Smyrnes, Knight and Meidinger. However, as of August 1, 2019, Knight and Smyrnes are the only convicts on death row.

Testimony

Neighbors and inmates 
Several jail inmates testified that Marinucci planned to kill Daugherty several days before her body was discovered. Neighbor Anthony Zappone heard Marinucci say, "I'm going to kill that bitch". He was also sentenced to jail for an unrelated burglary charge. Tina Warrick testified Marinucci told her she was disappointed with the type of Christmas garland Miller purchased to tie Daugherty up and dump her body. Floria Headen heard body slamming and screaming on February 12, 2010. Felisha Hardison, who was a cellmate and friend to Marinucci, testified that she was jumping on her bed, excited to be on the news.

Masters and Meidinger reached a plea bargain to testify.

Sentencing

Knight 
On April 12, 2012, Knight pleaded guilty to first- and second-degree murder, kidnapping, and conspiracy to commit murder and kidnapping. On August 30, 2012, a jury deliberated for several hours, before voting to put Knight to death. In September 2014, Knight appealed his sentence. His trial was delayed several times, and his sentence was upheld in March 2019. In November 2020, Knight attempted to appeal his sentence via the Supreme Court of Pennsylvania. The appeal included statements and claims that jurors acted with passion and prejudice and arbitrarily imposed the death penalty. However, it was unanimously rejected by the judges.

Marinucci 
On August 3, 2011, Marinucci was formally given a mandatory life sentence without the possibility of parole after being found guilty in May of first-degree murder. She was 17 years old at the time of the crime so she was ineligible for the death penalty, as she was still a minor. Marinucci had her life without possibility of parole sentence revoked, due to the 2012 and 2016 supreme court rulings Miller v. Alabama and Montgomery v. Louisiana. However, on July 1, 2015, a jury decided to re-sentence her to her previous sentence. Marinucci refused to answer any questions before she attended. In May 2022, Marinucci was resentenced to 60 years to life in prison with parole eligibility in 2070.

Meidinger 
On December 4, 2013, Amber Christine Meidinger (born January 12, 1990), was sentenced to 40 to 80 years in prison after pleading guilty to third-degree murder, kidnapping, and conspiracy. Meidinger filed paperwork in November 2019 with the state's Board of Pardons, seeking early termination of her 40- to 80-year prison sentence.

Amber Meidinger almost received the death penalty until she agreed to testify against the others. Westmoreland County District Attorney dropped his effort of the death penalty. Her defense attorney, Tim Dawson, questioned why she wanted to testify. During the testimony, she admitted she lied about the state of her mental health. Meidinger falsely told police officers that she had mental issues.

Miller 
Peggy Darlene Miller (born February 3, 1983), was sentenced to 35 to 74 years.

Smyrnes 
On February 28, 2013, Smyrnes was sentenced to death. Smyrnes appealed his sentence. In February 2017, a judge upheld his death sentence. His execution was delayed in July 2017.

Masters 
Robert Loren Masters Jr. (born December 22, 1973) pleaded guilty to third-degree murder, conspiracy to commit murder, and conspiracy to commit kidnapping on December 19, 2013.  Masters was sentenced to 30 to 70 years. Masters' attorney, William Gallishen, helped Masters reach a plea bargain against the other five. After he agreed, he was moved to another jail for protection because other suspects were being held there. He did not publicly share any information related to the plea bargain.

Incarceration 
Robert Loren Masters is currently imprisoned in the State Correctional Institution – Greene, Ricky Ven Smyrnes and Melvin Knight are in the State Correctional Institution - Phoenix, Peggy Darlene Miller and Amber Meidinger are in the State Correctional Institution - Muncy, and Angela Marinucci is imprisoned in the State Correctional Institution - Cambridge Springs.

Legacy 
Forensic pathologist and former Allegheny County Coroner Cyril H. Wecht, who had conducted and reviewed thousands of autopsies of homicide victims, stated, "... This is one of the most horrific cases I have seen... You have one young, defenseless woman, six people who are keeping her captive and doing all of these things, knowing she is [mentally challenged]. Put it all together, it is bizarre, it is extreme barbarism."

On April 23, 2012, at a conference, Pennsylvania State Senator Kim Ward proposed a legislation law named "Jennifer's Law." The proposal would make it illegal for someone to witness a violent crime and fail to report it to the police. Failure to report the crime would be a misdemeanor of the third degree.

"Cruel Intentions", an episode of Frenemies: Loyalty Turned Lethal, is a biopic based on the events.

See also 
Murder of Gemma Hayter

External links 
 Jennifer's Law - proposed legislation by Pennsylvania state senator Kim Ward

References

Deaths by person in Pennsylvania
2010 in Pennsylvania
2010 murders in the United States
2011 in Pennsylvania
2012 in Pennsylvania
2013 in Pennsylvania
Murder in Pennsylvania
February 2010 crimes in the United States
February 2010 events in the United States
Greensburg, Pennsylvania
Female murder victims